Francis Michael Hare, 6th Earl of Listowel (born 28 June 1964), styled Viscount Ennismore until 1997, is an Irish and British peer. He first sat in the House of Lords by right of his United Kingdom peerage of Baron Hare and was later one of the ninety hereditary peers elected to remain in the House of Lords after the passing of the House of Lords Act 1999, where he sat as a crossbencher. He retired from the House on 21 July 2022.

Lord Listowel is a member of the Ascendancy, the old Anglo-Irish ruling class.

The son of William Hare, 5th Earl of Listowel, and Pamela Mollie Day, and nephew of John Hare, 1st Viscount Blakenham, he was educated at Westminster School and Queen Mary and Westfield College, London, where he graduated with a BA degree in English literature in 1992. In 1997, he succeeded to his father's titles. The earldom is named after Listowel, a town in the north of County Kerry in Ireland.

References

Sources

Profile, members.parliament.uk. Accessed 17 December 2022.

External links

1964 births
Alumni of Queen Mary University of London
Crossbench hereditary peers
Living people
People educated at Westminster School, London
6
Francis
Hereditary peers elected under the House of Lords Act 1999